Torre San Giovanni is a frazione of the comune of Ugento, in the province of Lecce (Apulia), southern Italy. It is located on the south-western coast of the Salento peninsula, facing the Ionian Sea.

History

In the past it hosted an important Roman harbour and a relevant trade centre, as archeological discoveries testify.

The octagonal tower devoted to San Giovanni was built in 1565 and is located on a tiny peninsula which once surrounded the small port. Inside the tower there is a fresco painted by San Giovanni. On top of the tower there is a lighthouse.

See also
 Ugento
 Torre San Giovanni di Ugento Lighthouse

References

External links
 Comune di Ugento Official website 

Frazioni of the Province of Lecce
Localities of Salento
Towers in Italy